In mathematics, a symmetric matrix  with real entries is  positive-definite if the real number  is positive for every nonzero real column vector  where  is the transpose of  More generally, a Hermitian matrix (that is, a complex matrix equal to its conjugate transpose)  is
positive-definite if the real number  is positive for every nonzero complex column vector  where  denotes the conjugate transpose of 

Negative-definite and negative semi-definite matrices are defined analogously. A matrix that is not positive semi-definite and not negative semi-definite is sometimes called indefinite.

A matrix is thus positive-definite if and only if it is the matrix of a positive-definite quadratic form or Hermitian form. In other words, a matrix is positive-definite if and only if it defines an inner product.

Positive-definite and positive-semidefinite matrices can be characterized in many ways, which may explain the importance of the concept in various parts of mathematics. A matrix  is positive-definite if and only if it satisfies any of the following equivalent conditions.
  is congruent with a diagonal matrix with positive  real entries. 
  is symmetric or Hermitian, and all its eigenvalues are real and positive.
  is symmetric or Hermitian, and all its leading principal minors are positive.
 There exists an invertible matrix  with conjugate transpose  such that 
A matrix is positive semi-definite if it satisfies similar equivalent conditions where "positive" is replaced by "nonnegative", "invertible matrix" is replaced by "matrix", and the word "leading" is removed.

Some authors use more general definitions of definiteness, including some non-symmetric real matrices, or non-Hermitian complex ones.

Definitions 

Definitions for real matrices 
Formally,

Formally,

Formally,

Formally,

An  symmetric real matrix which is neither positive semidefinite nor negative semidefinite is called indefinite.

Definitions for complex matrices 
The following definitions all involve the term . Notice that this is always a real number for any Hermitian square matrix .

Formally,

Formally,

Formally,

Formally,

An  Hermitian complex matrix which is neither positive semidefinite nor negative semidefinite is called indefinite.

Consistency between real and complex definitions 
Since every real matrix is also a complex matrix, the definitions of "definiteness" for the two classes must agree.

For complex matrices, the most common definition says that  is positive-definite if and only if  is real and positive for every non-zero complex column vectors .  This condition implies that  is Hermitian (i.e. its transpose is equal to its conjugate), since  being real, it equals its conjugate transpose  for every  which implies . 

For example, if

then for any real vector  with entries  and  we have , which is always positive if  is not zero.

which is not real. Therefore,  is not positive-definite.

On the other hand, for a symmetric real matrix , the condition " for all nonzero real vectors " does imply that  is positive-definite in the complex sense.

Notation
If a Hermitian matrix  is positive semi-definite, one sometimes writes  and if  is positive-definite one writes . To denote that  is negative semi-definite one writes  and to denote that  is negative-definite one writes .

The notion comes from functional analysis where positive semidefinite matrices define positive operators.

This may be confusing, as sometimes nonnegative matrices (respectively, nonpositive matrices) are also denoted in this way.

Examples

Eigenvalues 
Let  be an  Hermitian matrix (this includes real symmetric matrices).
  is positive definite if and only if all of its eigenvalues are positive.
  is positive semi-definite if and only if all of its eigenvalues are non-negative.
  is negative definite if and only if all of its eigenvalues are negative
  is negative semi-definite if and only if all of its eigenvalues are non-positive.
  is indefinite if and only if it has both positive and negative eigenvalues.

The matrix  may be regarded as a diagonal matrix  that has been re-expressed in coordinates of the (eigenvectors) basis . Put differently, applying  to some vector , giving , is the same as changing the basis to the eigenvector coordinate system using , giving , applying the stretching transformation  to the result, giving , and then changing the basis back using , giving .

With this in mind, the one-to-one change of variable  shows that  is real and positive for any complex vector  if and only if  is real and positive for any ; in other words, if  is positive definite. For a diagonal matrix, this is true only if each element of the main diagonal—that is, every eigenvalue of  —is positive. Since the spectral theorem guarantees all eigenvalues of a Hermitian matrix to be real, the positivity of eigenvalues can be checked using Descartes' rule of alternating signs when the characteristic polynomial of a real, symmetric matrix  is available.

Decomposition

Let  be an  Hermitian matrix.
 is positive semidefinite if and only if it can be decomposed as a product

of a matrix  with its conjugate transpose.

When  is real,  can be real as well and the decomposition can be written as 

 is positive definite if and only if such a decomposition exists with  invertible.
More generally,  is positive semidefinite with rank  if and only if a decomposition exists with a  matrix  of full row rank (i.e. of rank ).
Moreover, for any decomposition , .

The columns  of  can be seen as vectors in the complex or real vector space , respectively.

In other words, a Hermitian matrix  is positive semidefinite if and only if it is the Gram matrix of some vectors .
It is positive definite if and only if it is the Gram matrix of some linearly independent vectors.
In general, the rank of the Gram matrix of vectors  equals the dimension of the space spanned by these vectors.

Uniqueness up to unitary transformations
The decomposition is not unique: 
if  for some  matrix  and if  is any unitary  matrix (meaning ),

However, this is the only way in which two decompositions can differ: the decomposition is unique up to unitary transformations.
then there is a  matrix  with orthonormal columns (meaning ) such that .
When  this means  is unitary.

This statement has an intuitive geometric interpretation in the real case:
A real unitary matrix is an orthogonal matrix, which describes a rigid transformation (an isometry of Euclidean space ) preserving the 0 point (i.e. rotations and reflections, without translations). 

Square root

A Hermitian matrix  is positive semidefinite if and only if there is a positive semidefinite matrix   (in particular  is Hermitian, so ) satisfying .

The non-negative square root should not be confused with other decompositions .
or any decomposition of the form ;
other only use it for the non-negative square root.

If  then .

Cholesky decomposition
Conversely if  is lower triangular with nonnegative diagonal then  is positive semidefinite. 
The Cholesky decomposition is especially useful for efficient numerical calculations.

Other characterizations 
Then we have the following

  if and only if  is an ellipsoid, or an ellipsoidal cylinder.
  if and only if  is bounded, that is, it is an ellipsoid.
 If , then  if and only if ;  if and only if .
 If  , then  for all  if and only if .  So, since the polar dual of an ellipsoid is also an ellipsoid with the same principal axes, with inverse lengths, we have  That is, if  is positive-definite, then  for all  if and only if 
Let  be an  Hermitian matrix. The following properties are equivalent to  being positive definite:
Therefore, the form is an inner product on  if and only if  is real and positive for all nonzero ; that is if and only if  is positive definite. (In fact, every inner product on  arises in this fashion from a Hermitian positive definite matrix.)
 Its leading principal minors are all positive The kth leading principal minor of a matrix  is the determinant of its upper-left  sub-matrix.  It turns out that a matrix is positive definite if and only if all these determinants are positive. This condition is known as Sylvester's criterion, and provides an efficient test of positive definiteness of a symmetric real matrix. Namely, the matrix is reduced to an upper triangular matrix by using elementary row operations, as in the first part of the Gaussian elimination method, taking care to preserve the sign of its determinant during pivoting process.  Since the kth leading principal minor of a triangular matrix is the product of its diagonal elements up to row , Sylvester's criterion is equivalent to checking whether its diagonal elements are all positive.  This condition can be checked each time a new row  of the triangular matrix is obtained.

A positive semidefinite matrix is positive definite if and only if it is invertible.
A matrix  is negative (semi)definite if and only if  is positive (semi)definite.

Quadratic forms 

A symmetric matrix  is positive definite if and only if its quadratic form is a strictly convex function.

In the  case, this is a parabola, and just like in the  case, we have

Theorem: This quadratic function is strictly convex, and hence has a unique finite global minimum, if and only if  is positive definite.

Proof: If  is positive definite, then the function is strictly convex. If  is not positive definite, then there exists some vector  such that , so the function  is a line or a downward parabola, thus not strictly convex and not having a global minimum.

For this reason, positive definite matrices play an important role in optimization problems.

Simultaneous diagonalization 
One symmetric matrix and another matrix that is both symmetric and positive definite can be simultaneously diagonalized. This is so  although simultaneous diagonalization is not necessarily performed with a similarity transformation. This result does not extend to the case of three or more matrices. In this section we write for the real case. Extension to the complex case is immediate.

Let  be a symmetric and  a symmetric and positive definite matrix. Write the generalized eigenvalue equation as  where we impose that  be normalized, i.e. .

Note that this result does not contradict what is said on simultaneous diagonalization in the article Diagonalizable matrix, which refers to simultaneous diagonalization by a similarity transformation. Our result here is more akin to a simultaneous diagonalization of two quadratic forms, and is useful for optimization of one form under conditions on the other.

Properties

Induced partial ordering
For arbitrary square matrices ,  we write  if  i.e.,  is positive semi-definite. This defines a partial ordering on the set of all square matrices.  One can similarly define a strict partial ordering . The ordering is called the Loewner order.

Inverse of positive definite matrix
Every positive definite matrix is invertible and its inverse is also positive definite. If  then .

Scaling 

Addition 

Multiplication
If , then  is also positive definite.
 If  is positive semidefinite, then  is positive semidefinite for any (possibly rectangular) matrix . If  is positive definite and  has full column rank, then  is positive definite.

Trace
The diagonal entries  of a positive-semidefinite matrix are real and non-negative. As a consequence the trace, . Furthermore, since every principal sub-matrix (in particular, 2-by-2) is positive semidefinite,

and thus, when ,

An  Hermitian matrix  is positive definite if it satisfies the following trace inequalities:

Another important result is that for any  and  positive-semidefinite matrices, . This follows by writing . The matrix  is positive-semidefinite and thus has non-negative eigenvalues, whose sum, the trace, is therefore also non-negative.

Hadamard product
If , although  is not necessary positive semidefinite, the Hadamard product is,  (this result is often called the Schur product theorem).

 Oppenheim's inequality: 
 .

Kronecker product
If , although  is not necessary positive semidefinite, the Kronecker product .

Frobenius product
If , although  is not necessary positive semidefinite, the Frobenius inner product  (Lancaster–Tismenetsky, The Theory of Matrices, p. 218).

Convexity
The set of positive semidefinite symmetric matrices is convex. For any vector :

This property guarantees that semidefinite programming problems converge to a globally optimal solution.

Relation with cosine 
The positive-definiteness of a matrix  expresses that the angle  between any vector  and its image  is always :

Further properties

 If  is a symmetric Toeplitz matrix, i.e. the entries  are given as a function of their absolute index differences: , and the strict inequality  holds, then  is strictly positive definite.
 Let  and  Hermitian. If  (resp.) then  (resp.).
 If  is real, then there is a  such that , where  is the identity matrix.
 If  denotes the leading  minor,  is the kth pivot during LU decomposition.
 A matrix is negative definite if its k-th order leading principal minor is negative when  is odd, and positive when  is even.
 If  is a real positive definite matrix, then there exists a positive real number  such that for every vector , . 
 A Hermitian matrix is positive semidefinite if and only if all of its principal minors are nonnegative. It is however not enough to consider the leading principal minors only, as is checked on the diagonal matrix with entries 0 and −1.

Block matrices and submatrices 
A positive  matrix may also be defined by blocks:

Then

Converse results can be proved with stronger conditions on the blocks, for instance, using the Schur complement.

Local extrema 
Therefore, the matrix being positive definite means that  has a unique minimum (zero) when  is zero, and is strictly positive for any other .

More generally, a twice-differentiable real function  on  real variables has local minimum at arguments  if its gradient is zero and its Hessian (the matrix of all second derivatives) is positive semi-definite at that point. Similar statements can be made for negative definite and semi-definite matrices.

Covariance
In statistics, the covariance matrix of a multivariate probability distribution is always positive semi-definite; and it is positive definite unless one variable is an exact linear function of the others. Conversely, every positive semi-definite matrix is the covariance matrix of some multivariate distribution.

Extension for non-Hermitian square matrices 
The definition of positive definite can be generalized by designating any complex matrix  (e.g. real non-symmetric) as positive definite if  for all non-zero complex vectors , where  denotes the real part of a complex number . Only the Hermitian part  determines whether the matrix is positive definite, and is assessed in the narrower sense above. It is immediately clear that is insensitive to transposition of M.

Consequently, a non-symmetric real matrix with only positive eigenvalues does not need to be positive definite.

In summary, the distinguishing feature between the real and complex case is that, a bounded positive operator on a complex Hilbert space is necessarily Hermitian, or self adjoint. The general claim can be argued using the polarization identity. That is no longer true in the real case.

Applications

Heat conductivity matrix 
The negative is inserted in Fourier's law to reflect the expectation that heat will always flow from hot to cold. In other words, since the temperature gradient  always points from cold to hot, the heat flux  is expected to have a negative inner product with  so that .

See also 
Covariance matrix
M-matrix
Positive-definite function
Positive-definite kernel
Schur complement
Sylvester's criterion
Numerical range

Notes

References

External links 
 
 Wolfram MathWorld: Positive Definite Matrix

Matrices

de:Definitheit#Definitheit von Matrizen